Jawaharlal Nehru Technological University, Hyderabad (JNTU Hyderabad) is a public university, located in Hyderabad, Telangana. Founded in 1965 as the Nagarjuna Sagar Engineering College, it was established as a university in 1972 by The Jawaharlal Nehru Technological University Act, 1972. The university is situated at Kukatpally Housing Board Region in Hyderabad of India.

History 

Jawaharlal Nehru Technological University was established on 2 October 1972, by an act of State Legislature. On its formation, the Government Engineering Colleges at Anantapur, Kakinada and Hyderabad, along with the Government College of Fine Arts and Architecture at Hyderabad, became its constituent colleges. Subsequently, JNTU act 1972 was amended by JNTU (Amendment) Ordinance, 1992 1 to affiliate any other college or Institution notified by the A.P. State Government. Hence, JNT University is a multi-campus university with headquarters at Hyderabad.

As per the Act No. 30 and Act No. 31 of 2008 dated 24 September 2008, Jawaharlal Nehru Technological was divided into four universities, Jawaharlal Nehru Technological University Hyderabad (JNTUH), Jawaharlal Nehru Technological University Kakinada (JNTUK), Jawaharlal Nehru Technological University Anantapur (JNTUA) and Jawaharlal Nehru Architecture and Fine Arts University, Hyderabad.

Organisation and administration

Governance
This university consists of the constituent and affiliated colleges. The main officers and councils of the university are Chancellor, Vice-Chancellor (VC), Rector, Executive Council and Academic Senate. The Governor of Telangana is the Chancellor of the university. The first Vice-Chancellor of the university was Prof. D. N. Reddy. , the present Vice-Chancellor is Prof. Katta Narasimha Reddy, the Rector is Dr. A. Govardhan and the Registrar is Dr. M. Manzoor Hussain.

Constituent colleges
The university includes the following constituent colleges:
 JNTUH College of Engineering, Hyderabad
 JNTUH College of Engineering, Jagtial
 JNTUH College of Engineering, Manthani
 JNTUH College of Engineering, Sultanpur
 JNTUH College of Engineering, Rajanna Sircilla
 JNTUH School of Information Technology
 JNTUH Institute of Science and Technology
 JNTUH School of Management Studies
 UGC-Human Resource Development Centre (UGC-HRDC)

Academics

Academic programmes

An institution with academic and research-oriented courses, the B.Tech programs (undergraduate programs) number about 25. Major branches among them are Aeronautical Engineering, Automobile, Biotechnology, Information Technology, Electronics, Electrical, Instrumentation and Control, Metallurgy, Mechanical, Bio-medical, Chemical and Civil. A few courses are offered through the correspondence-cum-contact mode.

The postgraduate programs number 77, namely M.Tech, MSIT, MBA, MCA and MSc. The major branches are  Bio-Technology, Biochemical Engineering, Chemical Engineering, Civil Engineering, Remote-Sensing and GIS, Electronics and Communication Engineering, Water Resources, Mechanical Engineering, Nano-Technology, Energy Systems, Environmental Studies, Microbiology, Food Technology, Management, Computer Applications, Pharmaceutical Sciences, Environmental Geomatics and Environmental Management.

Rankings 

The National Institutional Ranking Framework (NIRF) ranked Jawaharlal Nehru Technological University, Hyderabad, 76 in the engineering ranking in 2022.

See also
 Jawaharlal Nehru University

References

External links
 

Engineering colleges in Hyderabad, India
All India Council for Technical Education
1965 establishments in Andhra Pradesh
1972 establishments in Andhra Pradesh
Educational institutions established in 1965
Educational institutions established in 1972
Jawaharlal Nehru Technological University
State universities in Telangana